June O'Neill could refer to:

June E. O'Neill, American economist
June F. O'Neill, former chair of the New York State Democratic Committee